"They All Sang 'Annie Laurie' (the Song That Reaches Ev'ry Heart)" is a World War I era song released in 1915. J. Will Callahan wrote the lyrics. F. Henri Klickmann composed the music. The song was published by Frank K. Root & Co. of Chicago, Illinois. On the cover of the sheet music is a group of soldiers singing around a camp fire. The image of a woman can be seen forming in the smoke. The song was written for voice and piano.

The song starts with group of soldiers gathered around a camp fire. They each are struggling with feelings of loneliness, and are missing their significant others back at home. One of the soldiers, tearing up, suggests they sing a song. In the end, they sing the Scottish song "Annie Laurie" together. The chorus is as follows:

The sheet music can be found at Pritzker Military Museum & Library.

References

Songs about music
1915 songs
Songs of World War I
Songs with lyrics by J. Will Callahan